The Veiled Prophet Parade and Ball was a yearly civic celebration in St. Louis, Missouri, over which a mythical figure called the Veiled Prophet presided. The first events were in 1878.

Overview 

The parade and ball were organized and funded by the Veiled Prophet Organization, an all-male, secret society founded in 1878 by prominent St. Louisans.

The organization chooses one member to be a Veiled Prophet who conducts meetings and oversees activities but not necessarily for one year, spokesman Allyn Glaub said in 1991. They were a highly select group culled from the area's business, civic and governmental leaders, "the people who run St. Louis and St. Louis County." At that time the organization was racially mixed.

Historian Thomas Spencer believes that the event generally revealed rather than soothed class conflicts. Spencer wrote that the VP parade was created in part to displace the parades regularly held by the trade unions. Spencer believed it cast workingmen in a passive rather than active role, not merely in the celebration, but in the mythology asserted for the history and economic life of the city. Occasionally the unions would stage events intended to mock the pretensions of the VP Ball. The leading socialist and working-class newspaper, St. Louis Labor, "wrote negatively" about the VP event and its organizers between the early 1900s and 1930.

The ball, which most recently took place on the Friday before Christmas each year, was attended by thousands, but was protested by Black Lives Matter supporters, as well as the St. Louis-based group Missourians Organized for Reform and Empowerment, which linked St. Louis's wealthiest one percent to the VP organization.

In 1995, the name of the riverfront celebration was changed to Fair Saint Louis, though the street procession was still called Veiled Prophet Parade. The date was fixed for Independence Day.  It continued to be funded by the Veiled Prophet Organization.

In 2003, the organization created a Community Service Initiative, through which members participate in a wide variety of projects in and around the city of St. Louis. In 2016, it secured a trademark for the name America's Birthday Parade.  In 2021,  The  "Veiled Prophet Parade" was replaced by the "American Birthday Parade" as to assuage concerns that the pageant was "a symbol of wealth, power, and to some racism."

Integration timeline

1930s-1940s 

Before World War II, the African-American community in St. Louis crowned its own "Veiled Prophet Queen," who included Ernestine Steele in 1939 and Blanche Vashon (later Sinkler), Georgia Williams, and Evelyn Hilliard. A 1940 newspaper column said that for years the official VP Parade had drawn

many persons, white and colored, to the city . . . [and that] Years ago there was a dance for the colored citizenry on that night, but that affair was long discontinued. Five years ago, Mrs. Zenobia Shoulders Johnson, one of the city's most active church and civic workers, conceived the idea of a style show which would culminate in the crowning of the "Veiled Prophet's Queen," someone representative of real St. Louis culture and society, much in the same manner of the original event. The idea caught fire, and from the first night, overflow crowds have witnessed the event at St. James [ A.M.E. ] Church. And, in addition, the idea became so popular that this year there are fully half a dozen similar projects as conceived by Mrs. Johnson being held this week by various other racial groups.

Postwar opposition 
Walter W. Witte, rector of St. Stephen's Episcopal Church, set forth the first widely circulated postwar opposition to the VP ball in a letter printed in the Post-Dispatch on September 30, 1966. He wrote:

. . . I recall my fascination some 10 years ago when I was told that St. Louis had a Veiled Prophet Parade. I was new to the city then and I presumed that this gala event must be some climactic community celebration, perhaps historical in nature. Then to discover that this was the yearly feast of the rich, culminating in a "coming out" ball at the municipal auditorium . . . was indeed a disappointment. Since then disappointment has given place to disgust. The spectacle of the wealthy daring to parade through the neighborhoods or near neighborhoods of the poor is outrageous.

And the ritual. Is it merely "cute," or are we witnessing the honest to God cult of the affluent with its prophets, queens, attending angels, heavenly courts taken seriously and paid for dearly by the educated business and professional men of the community? . . . .

Could it be turned into a genuine community event? I have an idea. If the powers would contact me, I have several outstandingly beautiful candidates in my parish for the Queen of Love and Beauty. Mind you, these candidates are not Mary Institute graduates nor are they currently attending Wellesley, Smith, or Vassar, nor are they likely to be. But they would, indeed, add beauty. Then again they would probably be disqualified. They suffer from one serious limitation. They are black.

Protests mount 

Protests against the VP Parade began in 1966 after police shot a black robbery suspect and Percy Green, head of the Action Council to Improve Opportunities for Negroes (ACTION) passed out leaflets urging that the annual VP parade be "stopped" in response to the killing, calling it "the personification of St. Louis racism and white supremacy."

The next year, ACTION scheduled a "City Dwellers Week" to coincide with Veiled Prophet activities. It was code named Target 84, a reference to the Prophet's 84th visit. The aim was to force an end to the VP, which William L. Matheus said was "a symbol of racial and economic oppression."

On September 30, 1967, ACTION sponsored a "Black Veiled Prophet Ball" in parody of the VP Ball, the latter which was said to be fostering "racial discrimination and segregation." The group planned the selection of a Queen of Human Justice, who would be chosen according to the number of tickets sold on her behalf.

On October 1, 1967, a "small group of marchers," led by Patrick Dougherty, a St. Louis University professor, contended in the suburb of Clayton, Missouri, that the VP Ball and Parade were "offensive to the Negro community" and should be transformed into a children's event.

The next weekend, some fifty demonstrators were in a sidewalk protest across the street from the VP Ball in Kiel Auditorium. Leaders, who had no tickets, demanded entry to the hall, and on October 6 three of them were arrested on charges of disturbing the peace and failure to obey the commands of a police officer; they were released on bond. They were Precious Barnes, in regalia as the "Black Veiled Prophet," Esther Davis, who was the Queen of Human Justice, and Witte.
Journalists said the newspeople were shoved and jostled by police and that some officers held hats and hands in front of cameras to prevent photos. Ron Gould, an 18-year-old seminary student, said he took a photo of a policeman beating a black woman, and another officer smashed his camera with a baton, then stepped on the exposed film. He later filed a complaint against the police department, which ruled he had no case. (Charges against Barnes, Davis, and Witte were dropped on January 23, 1968, because of insufficient evidence.)

The next day, Barbara Torrence, Ruth Poland, and Mary Ann Kerstetter were arrested for lying in the street in front of the Veiled Prophet Parade in protest of alleged racial discrimination. They were sentenced to thirty days in jail for resisting arrest but were placed on probation for a year.

In October 1967 Bishop George L. Cadigan asked Witte and William Matheus, St. Stephens Church curator, to resign their positions because of "misunderstandings about procedural matters and the seeming inability of Mr. Witte to relate to the program of the diocese." The activities of the two in demonstrations, particularly against the Veiled Prophet Ball, had "incurred the wrath of many Episcopal laymen," a newspaper report said.

Witte said he and Matheus regarded the annual VP ceremonies as symbols of social bigotry and economic discrimination. Cadigan responded that he "holds no brief for the Veiled Prophet Ball and Parade, and it may well be a serious affront to the nonaffluent members of the St. Louis community," but, he said, the two clergymen "vastly overrated" the VP's significance, devoting "great energy, but little skill, in attacking it."

Count Basie cancellation 

In 1968, ACTION threatened to stage protests against musician Count Basie unless he canceled an agreement to play in the VP Parade, whose theme that year was "Music for Everyone." Basie agreed on September 25 to withdraw, "for personal reasons."

Changing parade route 

In 1968, United Press International reported that "ACTION has staged demonstrations at the ball and parade in recent years to protest that the ball was for whites only and that the parade flaunted white wealth down a route that skirted Negro neighborhoods. The route of this year's parade has been shifted to avoid some of the poorer neighborhoods."

More arrests 

Percy Green, William Brown, and William Mitchell were arrested on September 27, 1968, when they were denied entry to the ball. They ignored orders to stop marching directly in front of Kiel Auditorium. Sarah Jones and Barbara Jean Saper were arrested and fined after they chained themselves to one of the floats.

In 1969 Carl Jackson (that year's Black Veiled Prophet), Madame Carol (the Black VP queen), Lois Greer (Queen of Human Justice) and George Johnson were arrested after Jackson and Carol presented a slip of blue paper at the Kiel Auditorium door which they said was an invitation and refused to leave. Judge G. Johnson, Sharon Hall, and Rita Scott were arrested in 1970 when they tried to enter the VP Ball by presenting a written statement in lieu of tickets.

Percy Green, Melvin Carr, Florence Jarrett, Ralph Brown, and Gina Scott were arrested on December 22, 1971, on a charge of general peace disturbance when they attempted to enter Kiel Auditorium with no tickets.

Episcopal resolution 

A convention of the Episcopal Diocese of Missouri in October 1969 adopted a resolution stating that "Actions of the Veiled Prophet Society are such to be a source of constant irritation to the black communities" in the diocese.

Unmasking the Prophet 

On December 23, 1972, six women with tickets provided by debutantes and two of them, white women Gena Scott and Jane Sauer, walked together into Kiel Auditorium, with no problem. Then Charles Reed, that year's Black Veiled Prophet went to the entrance with Beverly Crosby and Florence Jarrett, presented the gatekeeper with three tickets and a statement demanding entrance. They were denied entry because they were not "dressed properly." Refusing to leave, they were arrested and taken to a police station.

Sauer and Scott took balcony seats on opposite sides of the house. During the program, Sauer began dropping leaflets into the audience, then "threw the rest of the leaflets over the railing" as two men converged on her and began to pull her away.

Meanwhile, Scott was rappelling on a rope from a balcony when she tumbled hard to the floor, climbed to her feet, rushed to the stage, grabbed the crown and veil and yanked it from that year's VP. The Post-Dispatch reported that "the Veiled Prophet, whom everybody could see was bald, and very angry, struggled gallantly to restore the veil and its 95-year-old tradition [of anonymity] to its proper place." The VP was later to be revealed as Monsanto executive Tom K. Smith Jr.

Scott said: "The chairman of the VP committee, Alexander Cornwell Jr., had wanted to press charges, but when he was informed that the Veiled Prophet would have to appear in open court to do so, the whole matter was dropped." Scott's ribs were diagnosed as bruised and possibly broken.

Aftermath and changes 

In early 1973, Gena Scott was awakened when her car was bombed outside of her apartment. Her apartment was vandalized numerous times.
In 1975, ACTION member Patrick Dougherty unfurled a banner on stage reading "ACTION Protests Racist VP," and in 1976, two ACTION members sprayed what Green called "commercial tear gas" at VP audience members along the stage.

In November 1973, a class-action suit was filed on behalf of all black St. Louisans by Percy Green, George (Judge) Johnson and Melvin Carr, claiming the VP organization's rental agreement for Kiel was illegal and that blacks viewed the VP Committee as an "antiblack, semisecret organization made up of members of the economic, political and social white power structure" of St. Louis.

The parade was first telecast over station KSD in 1977.

In 1979 the Veiled Prophet Organization admitted its first black members, three physicians.

In 1987, fair officials and St. Louis Metro Police Department were confronted with accusations of racism when they closed the Eads Bridge to pedestrian access, which reduced the ability of attendees from East St. Louis to reach the VP fair, where predominantly black residents were blamed for the crime that had been occurring there. Judge John F. Nangle ordered the bridge to reopen, saying that there was no proof that the crime was caused by East St. Louisans.

Some thirty people protesting police shootings in Ferguson, Missouri, and elsewhere in 2014 marched and chanted outside the Hyatt Hotel, St. Louis, where the ball was taking place.

Founding of the Veiled Prophets 

The VP organization was founded by prominent St. Louisans who had been invited to a meeting in a letter signed by John B. Maude, John A. Scudder, George Bain, John G. Priest, and D.P. Rowland.

The organization had its roots in the St. Louis Agricultural and Mechanical Fair, an annual harvest festival since 1856.
Featuring agricultural crops, crafts, and demonstrations, it attracted people from throughout the region. Spencer wrote that city boosters devised the Veiled Prophet Fair in an attempt to reclaim from the rapidly growing city of Chicago the fading pre-eminence for St. Louis as a manufacturing center and agricultural shipping point.

On March 20, 1878, Charles Slayback, a grain broker who had spent several Reconstruction years in New Orleans after the Civil War and become acquainted with its Mardi Gras traditions, called a meeting of local business leaders at the Lindell Hotel. He and his brother Alonzo, a former colonel with a Missouri Cavalry Regiment which fought for the Confederates, created a mythology for a secret elite society, whose public demonstrations would coincide with the annual St. Louis Agricultural and Mechanical Fair. Alonzo wrote The First Panorama of Progress of the Veiled Prophets.
The brothers borrowed the name "the Veiled Prophet of Khorassan" from Irish poet Thomas Moore's Lalla Rookh; they also incorporated features from the Comus of New Orleans. In Moore's poem, the Veiled Prophet was a horribly disfigured man who considered himself a prophet.

The first visit of the Prophet was thus in 1878, after the Great Panic of 1875, when business needed reviving and St. Louis needed development.

In a 1956 promotional book by Vincent H. Sanders and Theodore D. Drury Jr., the Prophet was a world traveler who chose to bless St. Louis; reporter Walter E. Orthwein of the Globe-Democrat wrote in 1958 that the VP was conceived as "a kind of Santa Claus for grownups."

Secrecy 

The VP organization has traditionally attempted to keep its membership rolls secret.  In  his Centennial History of Missouri, Walter B. Stevens wrote: "Mystery as to preparations greatly enhances public interest" and means "that the membership must be moved by altruistic motives in giving their fellow Missourians this annual pageant; that no public limelight could be focused on the doers."

The VP was sometimes referred to as the Grand Oracle, as in 1880. The identity of a given year's leader has ostensibly been a secret, but the earliest members of the Veiled Prophet organization (in 1878) were reported in 1964 to have included Alonzo W. Slayback, Frank Gaiennie, John A. Scudder, Henry C. Haarstick, George Bain, Robert P. Tansey, George H. Morgan, Wallace Delafield, John B. Maude, D. P. Rowland, Leigh I. Knapp, David B. Gould, Henry Paschell, H. I. Kent, E. Pretorious, William H. Thompson, and William A. Hargadine, H.B. Loudermann, and George D. Capen.

As for the leadership, public records showed in 2021 that "the executive officers remain some of the region's most powerful businessmen and dynastic patricians[,] with surnames such as Schnucks (grocery stores), Desloge (lead mining), Maritz (employee incentives and corporate travel) and Kemper (banking)." The prophet crowned "a queen every year; their last names include Kemper, Busch, Danforth, Schnuck, Schlafly, Chouteau, Cabanne, Niedringhaus, Desloge and other historic St. Louis families.The identity of Maids of Honor, one of whom was tapped as Queen, was also kept secret until they were introduced at the Ball."

The only person ever identified in connection with the VP administration was Jane Lindemann, who in 1999 was the first woman to hold the post of "exec director."

First parade and ball 

The first parade and ball were held on Tuesday, October 8, 1878. The Prophet was selected secretly from among the members, who were made up of St. Louis's business and civic elite. The first Prophet was John G. Priest, a member of the city's Board of Police Commissioners.

1878 parade 

The Veiled Prophet was represented on the final float of the 1878 parade as:

a huge figure about twenty-five feet high, and looking like an overgrown cigar store sign, with a mosquito bar (mosquito netting) over its face. He was costumed in green and red, and was surrounded by members of his court. His scribe stood by with huge quill and a reservoir of ink at hand, ready to issue his mandates. Two high priests were behind his throne, and near by a villainous-looking executioner and a blood-curdling butcher's block. Fierce and warlike guards, with breastplates of brass and steel and helmets of the same metals, kept watchful eyes upon the sacred precincts of the Prophet.
In 1882 the Globe-Democrat described the same giant dummy as a "huge masked figure staring sphinx-like at the crowd." It had been used in previous parades until it was retired and replaced that year by a [human] "being with face masked and a long, white beard."
On Sunday, October 6, the Missouri Republican had captioned a woodcut of a masked, armed, and hooded man posing in Ku Klux Klan garb (previously used in the newspaper on August 23, 1875) as "the original Veiled Prophet himself," adding that "It will be readily observed from the accoutrements of the Prophet [a pistol, a shotgun, and a billy club] that the procession is not likely to be stopped by street cars or anything else." Historian Thomas M. Spencer interpreted the Republican'''s reference to "street cars" as related to the Great Railroad Strike of 1877. "Newspaper feature stories since the 1950s have described the 'first Veiled Prophet parade' as a way of healing the wounds of a bitter labor-management fight," the 1877 St. Louis general strike, he wrote. He added, however, that the first Veiled Prophet parade was "more a show of power than a gesture of healing." (See note.) 1878 ball 

The initial ball in 1878 was held in the festively decorated Grand Hall of the Merchants Exchange, beginning in the late evening after the completion of the Parade. Its official start was a quadrille of costumed men from the floats of the parade and the women who awaited them. After two dances, the first being J.S. Bach's Royal Quadrille, the men retired to replace their disguises with formal wear for the rest of the evening.

Suzanne (Susie) Slayback was chosen by the first Veiled Prophet, John G. Priest, to be the "belle" of the ball.

 Prophet's arrival 

Normally the Prophet was introduced to the public either as a real person or as a giant replication when his parade exited the "gloomy-visaged" Den, where the organization had its headquarters. But he also arrived via a different method, as follows:

 Boat 

For the first time, the Prophet came to St. Louis by boat on October 1, 1892, on the upriver steamer War Eagle. (See note.) A group of civic leaders sailed to Jefferson Barracks via the Republic and the Paul Tulane to greet him.  The First Regiment marched from St. Louis, and then everybody went back to St. Louis in fifty carriages or marched there in a special afternoon parade through crowded streets; a reception was held at the Exposition Building."St. Louis Carnival," The Burlington (Kansas) Nonpareil, September 30, 1892, page 1"The Veiled Prophet," The Thayer (Kansas) News, October 7, 1892, page 3

"A wagonette drawn by four horses went down to the staging," the Post-Dispatch reported, "and the Prophet took his seat on a raised cushion so that he might be seen by the curious and admiring multitude which he was to pass." At the St. Louis wharf, Samuel Kennard, an organizer of the Saint Louis Exposition, presented the Prophet with the keys to the city, and a band played "Hail to the Chief."

The VP arrived again via upriver boat Spread Eagle on October 1, 1900, at the foot of Vine Street, to be escorted to the Coliseum, where thousands had gathered.

 Airplane 

The Prophet arrived by airplane four times, from 1924 through 1927, followed by an informal parade to the Den."Veiled Prophet Carnival Oct. 4, 5," St. Louis Daily Globe-Democrat, September 4, 1927, image 14

 Notable VP Ball incidents and activities 

 The Belles and the Queens of Love and Beauty 

The custom of singling out a young woman for special attention began with the first Veiled Prophet Ball in 1878, when Suzanne (Susie) Slayback was chosen by the first Veiled Prophet, John G. Priest, to be the "belle" of the ball at the age of 16. According to a 1958 article in the St. Louis Globe-Democrat, in those earlier times it was "the custom of the Prophet to select a girl for his partner in the first dance at the ball.""Belle of First Ball Tells How She Felt," St. Louis Globe-Democrat,October 7, 1958, image 39

In 1884 the title of this honoree was changed to Queen of Love and Beauty. She was to "act as regent" between the Prophet's yearly visits and to "be in charge of the social life of the city."

In 2021 and 2022, two celebrities were denounced in social media for having been Veiled Prophet Queens when young.

 Some Twitter users called actress Ellie Kemper a "KKK princess" because in December 1999, she had been Queen of Love and Beauty at the VP Ball. She responded in a five-slide Instagram apology, beginning:Chloe Melas, "Ellie Kemper Apologizes for Participating in Controversial Pageant as a Teen," CNN Entertainment, June 8, 2021

Hi guys – when I was 19 years old, I decided to participate in a debutante ball in my hometown. The century-old organization that hosted the debutante ball had an unquestionably racist, sexist and elitist past. I was not aware of this history at the time, but ignorance is no excuse. I was old enough to have educated myself before getting involved.

 Trudy Busch Valentine, a Democratic candidate for the U.S. Senate, apologized in early 2022 for having been the VP Queen in December 1977. She wrote: "I should have known better, and I deeply regret that my actions hurt others."

 Maids and Ladies of Honor 

The Veiled Prophet selected the Queen from among the young women who had been invited as candidates. Beginning in 1894, those not selected were retained as Maids of Honor. A number of married women were known as Ladies of Honor, to act as chaperones. In that year, residents of the wealthy West End, St. Louis, were treated to the appearance of

an unusually elegant carriage, with coachmen and footmen in handsome livery, . . . driving through the prominent thoroughfares and delivering on a silver salver a highly illuminated and gorgeous invitation signed by the Grand Oracle of the Veiled Prophet, . . . appointments of the ladies as Maids of Honor. . . . These invitations have been delivered only to members of the inner circle of the St. Louis One Hundred and are regarded as the most unique and beautiful specimens of engraving and embossing ever seen in the city.

The custom by 1940 was that:

Escorted by members of the Prophet's secret order, the maids promenade the length of the Salle de Bal, pausing to curtsy before the box of the former queens as their names are announced, and then proceed to the
 royal dais, where, for the duration of the ceremony, they occupy gold and white seats on either side of the Prophet's throne. After the coronation they make their obeisance to their new queen and later join in the general dancing . . . .

 Invitations 

By 1883, the ball had become known as "the social event of the year," with funding "poured out like water," the result in bringing visitors to St. Louis "more than" justifying the cost,  the Post-Dispatch commented. People wanting to attend had to apply for tickets. The recipients were then chosen by a secret committee. In 1881, nearly four thousand invitations to the Veiled Prophet Ball were issued, and in 1885 there were more than seven thousand, of which some six thousand were used.

The Post-Dispatch wrote in September 1887 that the "Grand Oracle of the Veiled Prophets began the distribution of his favors yesterday, and to-day the mails are burdened with big yellow packages. By 6 o'clock to-morrow evening several thousand people who have been waiting in anxious expectation . . . will have their suspense relieved[, while others] will suffer a grievous disappointment at seeing the postman trot by their door without stopping."

The  "handsome and artistic" invitations, matching a different theme for each year, looked like this:1880. Theme: The Four Seasons.On one side of the engraved bid was a picnic scene, surrounded by representations of spring, summer, autumn, and winter. On the other side were the initials V.P. and four additional scenes — summer in Germany, spring in England, autumn in France, and winter in Russia. To insure that the "strictly personal" invitations would not be transferred at the ball:

Four masked detectives will be present, . . . furnished with a list of all the invitations issued. At the door the admit cards will not be taken up, but a corner will be torn off, and at any time during the ball, if the detectives see any one that they suspicion does not belong there, the party will be required to give his or her name, and show their admit card.The next year, 1881, "Two detectives disguised in swallowtail coats, clean white shirts and clerical neckties . . . didn't dance, and there was nothing else for them to do except look mysterious, which they did to perfection." Post-Dispatch, quoted in "Glorious and Grand," Topeka (Kansas) Daily Capital, October 8, 1881, image 6

 As there was a "mash" [overcrowding] last year, only half the number of invitations will be issued to the coming ball. Of course, everybody wants an invitation, and the number of disappointed ones will be large. The committee, however affable and kind-hearted, cannot include everybody, and those who have had a finger in such matters will readily understand that the position is by no means an easy or enviable one.1881. Theme: A Day-Dream in the Woodland or Insect LifeFifteen hundred tickets were printed in Paris, France, with "friends of the order" each able to reserve ten of them, and "a lady counts for as much as a gentleman in the list of names." The tickets were inside a coarse, outside enclosure, an imitation-leather second envelope and, finally, a peagreen envelope, the edge bordered in gold and the center bearing the face of the Veiled Prophet and the initials "V.P." Within it was yet another envelope, with a highly polished gold or silver paten, containing a pink or pale blue card, the former "for ladies" and the latter "for gentlemen." With them were dance cards for the women, "a huge butterfly which is placed in harp-shaped envelopes of transparent linen covered with figures of gold."1885. Theme: An Arabian NightThe invitations for 1885 were in "what seems to be a strong metal box," which, when opened, revealed a satin bag bound with silk, which contained "the coveted bidding." Five scenes from the Arabian Nights were "successfully disclosed by the turning aside of a leaf hinged on a pivot, or the opening of a leaf[,] book fashion. . . . Accompanying . . . were beautifully engraved admission cards to the ball, and the dancing programme."1888. Theme: Child LoreThe six thousand invitations, again printed in Paris, included "a spectacular view of Mother Goose, on a blue ray-lit sky . . . . The goose is very white and the old woman on its back is very red. She carries a broom in her left hand and in right holds the reins of her feathered steed. There is a friendly grin on the old lady's face . . . ."

Each invitation was inside a separate envelope, "even more gorgeous than its inclosure. Its . . .  principal pictorial feature is a regulation fairy queen of the modern stage in a decollete bodice, transparent skirts and ravishing pink tights. A diadem adorns her flowing yellow hair[,] and two rows of pearls shine upon her splendid throat. . . . She is seated on the backs of a pair of flame-tongued, red-tailed dragons, and the sky in the immediate vicinity is blazing with glory."

An enclosed ticket for the dance consisted, according to the same story, "of a "rabbit's foot growing out of a rabbit's head" [see accompanying image].1902. From the Discovery of the Mississippi to the World's FairThe invitation included "a map of the Louisiana Purchase, supported by the palm branch, with intertwined shields of the United States and the Republic of France, [see note] with the Veiled Prophet's seal," along with, "in colors," scenes and incidents in the Louisiana Purchase.1904. Theme: Art and ArchitectureRecipients had to open three boxes, one inside another, to reach the souvenir,

It is useful and beautiful either upon my lady's toilet table or upon a gentleman's office desk, for the holding of trinkets or trifles. It is in the shape of a large sea shell, and it rests upon the table on four spherical knobs.1920. There were two thousand fewer invitations sent out that year, to avoid "the crowding that had so often in the past made balls uncomfortable," the Globe-Democrat reported, but that fact "did not make it any less democratic, for the invitations included all sorts and conditions of worthy St. Louisans."

 Dress requirements and customs 
 19th century 

The first year of the ball, 1879, "A great many ladies were in full evening dress, while others were attired in calling or reception toilets, and a few, seated, wearing their street suits and bonnets."
The rules required "full evening dress" for attendees, which for women meant that "low neck and short sleeves" would not be "insisted upon, but the wearing of hats or bonnets will not be countenanced... it is expected that ladies will appear in an elaborate coiffure." The "orders" that year were that women in hats or bonnets "will be required to go into the gallery [and] . . . will not be permitted to dance."

For men, the rule was swallow-tailed, black broadcloth, or Prince Albert coats, but not "light-colored, bob-tailed or business suits." Military uniforms were okay.

"A peculiar thing" about the ball in 1881, a Kansas City Times reporter averred, is that "the committee lays down a law that no lady in bonnet or gentleman not in full dress shall be admitted." Full dress for men was defined as "Black swallow-tail coat, black low-cut vest, black pants, white cravat and light gloves." Nevertheless, the reporter wrote, "Despite this... ladies were seen on the floor with bonnets. Gentlemen were there in light coats, the tails of which were pinned back, thus making an improvised swallow tail."

St. Louis Mayor Henry Ziegenhein refused to wear a dress suit when he was invited to attend the Veiled Prophet Ball and "welcome" the Veiled Prophet to his city in 1898. He said he had never worn one and never would, preferring a Prince Albert coat (frock coat), which he wore on all state occasions."St. Louis' Dress Coat Muddle," The Kansas City Journal, September 26, 1898, image 4

In the 1870s and 1880s, a carpet of linen was laid upon the floor for dancing, "to protect ladies' dresses.""The Veiled Prophet: Complete Regulations for the Grand Ball on Tuesday Evening," St. Louis Globe-Democrat, October 5, 1884, image 11

 20th century 

 1901–1919 

 1920–1934 

A Globe-Democrat reporter noted in 1920 that "short gowns and no gloves were the order of the day" for women at the VP Ball that year. "It was like a big reception at which all were friends, and they went about visiting with one another and nodding gayly." In 1921, ten of the seventy-five Maids of Honor wore their hair in a bobbed fashion. Strict dress rules were still in effect in 1930.

 1935 and after 

By 1935, men and women in the "floor seating and standing spaces, the boxes and balcony," were to be in "full evening dress," but gallery viewers were expected only to be "neatly dressed."

In summer 1986, Jennifer Knight, that year's Queen of Love and Beauty, headed a group of her court members in a fund-raising fashion show at Buder Park. The dress code was "sporty Sunday clothes, fun skirts — certainly not blue jeans," spokeswoman Ginny Orthwein said. A Post-Dispatch fashion writer advised in 1992 that for the Veiled Prophet, Fleur de Lis and St. Louis Charitable Foundation balls "white tie" for women can mean "a genuine ball gown, more opulent than most [other] formal attire worn" in St. Louis.

 Tableaux 

In 1883 the organization began a series of tableaux, which was "not to be an exclusive affair, nor to be confined to the members of the Veiled Prophets. . . . Any person, of respectable character" could send for tickets, which were limited so that they should "not fall into the hands of improper or disreputable characters." Seats at the Olympic Theater were five dollars each, and there would be "no discrimination." In addition to the tableaux, musical attractions were on the bill. There would be no requirement for "full dress.""The Prophet's Tableaux," St. Louis Post-Dispatch, July 13, 1889, image 7

In conjunction with the 1889 removal of the VP Ball from the Merchants Exchange to a new site at the Music Hall, the program was changed that year from a March and Veiled Prophet's Quadrille to "a series of magnificent tableaux" with "elegantly costumed" participants. The tableaux, with scenery and costumes echoing the theme of the parade floats, continued at least until 1890.

 Mexican visitors 

In 1898, St. Louis was one stop for a large group of visitors on tour from Mexico,  and Mrs. Otto F. Forster of St. Louis arranged for the women of that group to be "given an insight into the high social life" of the city, but she could not find "enough society women who can speak Spanish to form a reception committee." From the local Latin-American Club she received a list of women who could speak the language, but, as the Post-Dispatch reported, "it didn't suit. The ladies were all stenographers and probably not one of them figured as a maid of honor at a Veiled Prophet's Ball or acted as a lady patroness at a swell function. They were all nice and good, no doubt, Mrs. Forster argued, but they didn't represent what is conceded to be society in St. Louis."

 After coronation 

Before 1915, the newly crowned Queen was taken by family and friends to a fashionable hotel for a "light cotillion," or light refreshments, and then escorted home. In that year, the supper was supplanted by an elaborate party, first at the St. Louis Country Club, then over time at the Chase Hotel and next the Jefferson Hotel (for 27 years).

Gus O. Nations, chief prohibition agent in St. Louis, announced in 1922 that his agents would patrol hotels "where guests at the Veiled Prophet Ball will congregate" after their departure from the dance. If liquor comes "within the gaze of a prohibition enforcement agent," the bearer could be arrested under the Volstead Act, he warned.

In 1926, as in "past years" and after "a ceremony of allegiance to the new Queen," the custom for her and some others was to leave the venue "and spend the rest of the evening in hotel ballrooms or dining rooms." In 1940, twenty-two young men were invited to attend such a supper dance at the Hotel Jefferson (St. Louis, Missouri); with a blue carnation in their lapels, they would "have the privilege of dancing with any of the ladies present whether or not they have been formally introduced."

 The married Queen 

In 1928, Mary Ambrose Smith, who was selected as Queen, was found to have secretly married Dr. Thomas Birdsall days earlier, violating the rule that the Queen of Love and Beauty must be a "maiden." The Post-Dispatch
quoted a man "high in the councils of the Veiled Prophet organization," who said: "We have no precedent to guide us. The disclosure is most extraordinary, astounding, to be exact."

In a 1979 interview with the St. Louis Times, Smith recalled how the Veiled Prophet:

gave her traveling money and told her to "begone, don't register at any large hotels, and don't use your real name."... Smith was "made to feel she disgraced her family. None of her friends stuck by her (she was told she could not visit their houses), she was never invited to another VP ball, her picture was removed from the collection of queens' portraits at the Missouri Historical Society, and her name was deleted from the Social Register.

 Bengal Lancers 

In 1880, "armed attendants" accompanied the presentation of the Veiled Prophet in a ceremonial procession before the Ball. An honor guard for the VP continued around 1922 with uniforms modeled after those of a British first life guard; then, over time, a West Point cadet and, next, a cavalier. In 1935 the men were fitted with a new look: that of a Bengal lancer of India, with a royal blue turban, a scarlet tunic, white breeches, white gauntlets and black jackboots with silver spurs. The Globe Democrat reported that year:
The turban is striped with yellows and reds with a green center stripe; each color representing a religion of these fighting men. The green signifies Mohammedanism, while the other colors stand for the various other Eastern faiths.

In 1930, the team had been costumed "in uniforms of the period of the Restoration in England," with "quaint arms in keeping with the costumes."

Each year, the guard performed an exhibition drill before the introduction of the Prophet to the assemblage. As time passed, their movements drew laughter:

(1937) The Prophet's Guard, still garbed as Bengal lancers, began squads-righting and forming perfect fronts. The laughter which greeted them . . . must have been caused either by their [fake] black beards or their bamboo lances, which, when held defensively before them, caused some of the spectators to ask whether the fishing was good.

(1949) Another highlight was offered by the pompously correct Bengal Lancers, who won applause and some deliberately provoked titter when their military maneuvers . . . went awkwardly awry. They seemed to enjoy the few bobbers perhaps more than their 10,000 spectators.

In 1960, the Lancers rode horseback during the Parade, just ahead of the Prophet's float.

By 1986, laughter was expected, with Patricia Rice of the Post-Dispatch observing that the Lancers'

antics begin and end every Veiled Prophet Ball, setting its tone, and last night . . . the bearded, turbaned lancers once again kept the 1,500 guests laughing. Such fun is just one of the ways in which the guests are reminded that the ball is primarily a party, and that nothing must be taken too seriously.

 Grand march and quadrille 

The first ball, in 1878, began with a quadrille of costumed men from the parade and the women who awaited them. After two dances, the first being J.S. Bach's Royal Quadrille, the men retired to replace their disguises with formal wear for the rest of the evening. The next year, 1879, the Veiled Prophet and retinue entered the room and proceeded to execute a grand march, followed by a quadrille with "fair ones of the earth as partners." In 1890 the music was the Coronation March by Giacomo Meyerbeer. The Royal Quadrille was on the program as late as 1921.

 Ball location and duration 

The first VP Ball in 1878 was in the "beautiful precincts of the Chamber of Commerce," also known as the Merchants Exchange, the largest hall in the city, with some 1,400 seats. But much of the space was taken up by a rostrum, a fountain, telegraph desks and tiers of seats around the sides.

The ball began after the parade was over and the participants had returned to the dance venue. "The festivities lasted to the early dawn."

In 1889 and 1890 the venue was switched to the Grand Exposition Music Hall, with a gallery of 1,100 seats and a dress circle of 1,400. There, "the Prophets will be able to give a tableau on the stage before the ball, as is done in New Orleans."

In the first part of the 20th century, the ball was held at the St. Louis Coliseum. Beginning in 1936 it took place at the Municipal Auditorium (which had been renamed the Kiel Auditorium) until a lawsuit was brought against the Veiled Prophet organization for shutting down the public auditorium for weeks at a time, arguing that the common taxpayers did not have access to the event. In the 1950s, the Chase Park Plaza Hotel constructed the opulent Khorassan Ballroom specifically to host the annual debutante ball, and the event was formally moved there in December 1975.

 Memorabilia 

The Matrons of Honor in 1920 received as gifts black moiré bags lined with white, with clasps and trimmings of gold. The Maids of Honor received gold bar pins embellished with designs in filagree.

The Queen in 1930 was given a diadem set with 71 diamonds, two pearls and two sapphires, with the crown designed so it might be removed from the platinum bandeau and worn as a brooch or pendant. An 8-inch plume was of spun silver. The Maids got coronets, "small-scale duplicates" of the one worn by the Queen, with only 51 diamonds.

In 2018, two "jewel-encrusted" gold and silver Veiled Prophet tiaras, worn by a Special Maid in 1894 and the Queen of Love and Beauty in 1896, were stolen from the Missouri History Museum. They were never recovered."Century-old Tiaras Stolen From Missouri History Museum," St. Joseph News-Press, April 19, 2018, page B2

 Children's and teens' events 

"Miniature" Veiled Prophet balls were scheduled with children, an early one in May 1936 at the Independent Evangelical Church and another at Greeley Presbyterian Church in October 1938, with the crowning of a "Queen." A Prophet and Queen were crowned at Lowell School in 1940. The first after World War 2 was at the Zion Methodist Church in June 1946. Villa Duchesne High School held Miniature VP events both before and after the war."Party at Villa Duchesne," St. Louis Post-Dispatch, October 8, 1940, image 15"Queen of Miniature V.P. Ball," St. Louis Star-Times, October 1, 1949, image 3

 Notable VP Parade incidents and activities 

 Lawsuit 

In 1879, George Soulie, who had been living in New Orleans engaged in work on the annual Mardi Gras celebration, sought to do similar work for the second Veiled Prophet Parade in St. Louis. He was placed in touch with businessman John G. Priest, known as a kind of "boss" Prophet. The two signed a contract for Soulie "to paint, decorate, and fix up generally in first-class style twenty-one chariots, or floats" for $630. He worked for three weeks, then was discharged by Superintendent Daniel E. Carroll.

Because the Prophets were supposed to be nameless, "every effort" was made to keep the matter quiet, but Soulie filed suit against Priest, president; Frank Galennie, secretary; Daniel Carrol, superintendent; Charles E. Slayback and Preston T. Slayback. The Daily Globe Democrat reported that after "the indignant artist threatened to reveal all he knew concerning the Prophets and their identity,"  a "consultation of the high-muck-a-mucks of the V.P.'s was held," they offered $200, Soulie withdrew the suit, "the bounced artist promised to remain true to his plighted word not to squeal, and the awful mystery which surrounds the Prophets remains as impenetrable as before."

 Courthouse Square 1879. In the second year of the pageant, the Post-Dispatch reported that the "dazzling display" would cost some seventy thousand dollars, that "seats are being erected at every available corner, and [that] fabulous prices are being paid for rooms along the proposed route. . . . At the Court-house the grand procession will come to a halt[,] and there will be a splendid display of fire works."

The paper reported that "The corner grass plots in the Court-house square have been boarded over and will, it is said, accommodate 3,500 people just at the very turning point in the procession. . . . Fire-works will be displayed at frequent intervals, and the fiery shower from the dome of the Court-house . . . will be one of the grandest sights ever seen by any public."

But, according to the Post-Dispatch, that venture "created a great deal of dissatisfaction and discussion as to the right of the city to allow the public square to be used for a private enterprise." Leslie Moffett, a member of the Board of Police Commissioners, "understanding that some trouble might ensue to the police, owing  to the general popular opinion that the people had a right to the Court-house square and might try to force their way into the enclosing" tried to find out who was behind the idea. Contractor E.C. Simmons responded that the seats were "for the benefit of the Veiled Prophets" and that they were "not a private enterprise or speculation in any sense whatever." The tickets were on sale for a dollar each in a stand at a local department store.

The Post-Dispatch added:

The police authorities decline to say what they will do about protecting the seats, so that there is a good deal of doubt about what will occur should the mob rush in and take possession. . . . In this connection it may be stated that the hackmen who stand around the Court-house square, having been requested to vacate the place tonight in order not to obscure the view of the occupants of seats in the court yard, refuse to do so, saying the city gives them permission to stand around the square, and they will not forego it for the accommodation of those who purchase tickets to the inclosures.

Further dissension arose when it was reported that Mayor Henry Overstolz and city officials would view the pageant from a room in the courthouse, thus "controlling the Court-house" on the evening of the parade.  Overstolz countered that he had simply "asked Judge [Amos Madden] Thayer for a window in his court-room, and he gave me his private room. I merely suggested that the invitations be extended by the heads of the apartments [departments?] so that the right parties will assemble there, as there are a number of valuable papers in the building. All sorts of rumors are flying about."

On the evening of this second parade, a "stream of lights, red and blue, burst forth upon the cornice of the Court-house . . . .  A flight of pigeons . . . sprang out of their suddenly illuminated nests, and fled from their time honored homes in dismay. . . . A cataract of flame [fireworks] flowed down the ashen-colored roof of the dome . . . [looking like] a flood of molten lava."1894. The courthouse steps "looked like a giant anthill"  they were so jammed with people.

 Rain delays 

The second parade and ball were postponed for one day in 1879, until Wednesday, October 7, because of a "miserable, penetrating and thoroughly unpleasant rain." The St. Joseph (Missouri) Gazette said: "The interest in this affair is simply amazing. Excursion trains on all the railroads leading into the city have been crammed to excess all day[,] and not less than forty thousand people came into the city."

 Crowding 1878. Onlookers filled every available viewing niche. From the windows of the Shorb & Boland stationers on Washington Avenue, for example, they "stretched their bodies far out, at the risk of falling to the sidewalk."1879. The streets "were thronged to such a degree that at times the procession was obliged to halt until the mounted police force and company of cavalry . . . could make an opening in the dense crowd. Every window and doorstep was filled to its utmost capacity. . . ." Theaters halted their performances as the parade passed through the streets fronting them, like a production of H.M.S. Pinafore at the Mercantile Library Hall.1882. Many thousands arrived via Mississippi River steamer in 1882, the Post-Dispatch said. Under the headline "THE GREAT JAM,"  it reported that:
The largest number of people who ever congregated within the limits of the city has arrived within the past few days. The hotels are crowded to their utmost capacity, from three to ten persons being crowded into every bed-room, while the halls and parlors are filled with cots closely packed together. . . . The Union depot was a perfect jam all day. Such a crowd never was seen . . .  before at any time . . . . All the railroads were running special trains, many of them coming in by sections, being too long to be drawn by one or two engines.1890. The Post-Dispatch reported that:

Every express wagon, furniture van and grocery wagon was out for the evening and on the improvised seats were motley crowds. The colored [African-American] driver had his family and friends there and made a profit by making room for a few eager sight-seers . . . . What a motley crowd it was, to be sure, but a very orderly one.1908. A new system of "pay as you enter" streetcar service was put to the test in handling VP commuters. Women clad in ballroom gowns had to wait on rear platforms while their escorts looked for the small change in their full-dress suits and then they all had to push their way through narrow swinging entrance doors. Women who had taken their children to see the parade were forced to stand on street corners while others, "more active and less encumbered, pushed and fought their way into the [street]cars."

 The Den and the floats 

The Den has been a building or complex of buildings where the floats and costumes have been prepared for the VP and America's Birthday Parade activities.

 On parade night in 1879, the Den was described by a reporter as a "great black building running along the side of Twelfth Street, from Market to Chestnut. It stood dim and grim against the evening sky, with not a luminous line or brilliant knot-hole to be seen against its gloomy walls until 7 o'clock, when the yard gate to the east of the building suddenly opened and displayed to view an array of torch-bearers ready to march forward at a moment's notice."

In 1880, design of the floats was done by artist Carl Gutherz, and his drawings were sent to Paris, France, where the costumes were made. The next year, 1881, St. Louis artists Thomas C. Noxon and Richard Halley did the work.

The Den was at 12th and Chestnut in 1883.
The Den land on the northeast corner of 12th and Market was sold in June 1884 by Charles L. Hunt to Thomas T. Turner, bundled with other property.

In 1890 through 1924, the floats were prepared in a "large building" between 21st and 22nd at Walnut street."The Pageant," St. Louis Daily Globe-Democrat, October 9, 1901, image 8  In 1893, it was written that:

The squatty brick building was the den of the Veiled Prophet. . . . 2120 Walnut Street is the number. . . . It contains no window nearer the ground than 15 feet.
 . . . In each door, about 20 feet from the bottom,, are two windows, heavily grated and covered on the inside with curtains, . . . a wealth of skylight perforates the roof. Around this building as early as 6 o'clock people began to gather [on VP night]. Little lads in the mischievous years were as plentiful there as the proverbial leaves in Vallambrosa. They got down flat on their stomachs at the bottom of the corrugated iron doors and tried to get a look at his mysterious Majesty's splendors.

The Stroh Brothers purchased the Walnut Street property in 1924, to replace the Den with a large garage for "trucks and passenger cars."

Burglars entered the Den at 102 Rankin Avenue on January 26, 1931, hammered the combination off the safe and escaped with $2,700 worth of jewelry, $250 in cash and a .32-caliber automatic pistol.

In 1932, the Den was on "dingy Rankin Avenue," the Post-Dispatch reported, number 102 South at LaClede, where it remained until at least 1958, when a fire damaged five floats being prepared for the VP Parade. Five firemen were overcome by dense, acrid smoke. The victims received bouquets and notes from the Veiled Prophet which said, "With deep appreciation and gratitude.""V.P. Parade On Tomorrow Despite 3-Alarm Fire at Den," St. Louis Globe-Democrat, October 7, 1958, image  1

In the year of the fire, the St. Louis Post-Democrat claimed that the Den "becomes an ordinary warehouse as soon as the parade is over. Having no visible abiding place, the order is not subject to influence in other social and business clubs, and this again constitutes an important fact in its longevity."

The South Rankin building was demolished in April 1960 for redevelopment of Mill Creek Valley, and the Den was resurrected in a warehouse on Prospect Avenue."V.P. Parade," October 6, 1960, image 15

The Post-Dispatch in 1981 described the Den as "a complex of former Falstaff brewery warehouses at 301 Prospect Avenue that serve as a combination workshop, storage facility and  archives for VP parades and balls." In February 1991 the Den was a large cinderblock building near Spring Avenue and Forest Park Boulevard.

Brook Marion was the leading float painter of a six-man crew in the Den in 1999.

 Reaction of onlookers 1881: A "gang of roughs" pelted the floats with mud and stones. On the other hand, during the same parade "Several young ladies in the windows of 1630 Pine" who attracted the attention of men on one of the floats "received quite a pelting at their hands with nuts and other missiles."

In every window of all the residences and stores . . . were groups of men, women and children, crooking their necks and straining their eyes. . . . This over,

they repaired to the beer saloons, the restaurants, the theaters and hotels and proceeded to 'round off' the occasion in such manner as their tastes dictated. A few boys, lined up in 'hand to shoulder' fashion, occasionally forced their way through the crowds of women and children, but this rudeness was received good-naturedly.1884: At Broadway and Fourth Streets "there was a mob . . . of the most unruly character. A dozen policemen fought them back, but they crowded up to the very wheels of the floats."1911: According to Marguerite Martyn in the St. Louis Post-Dispatch:

The slapstick, so long indispensable to low comedy, found a new use among the crowds . . . they used the slapstick to the extreme embarrassment of many women. The carnival spirit, for the most part tempered by high good humor, at times verged on rowdyism. Girls used a stick ripped with feathers to tickle the faces of young men, and they retaliated vigorously with the slapstick.1920: "Ordinarily reserved young ladies used the 'Coney Island ticklers,' sold by countless vendors, upon the chins and faces of every young man who came within an arm's length," the Globe-Democrat reported. "And the favor was reciprocated."1926: Slapsticks, rolled newspapers and feather ticklers were used "to tease and torment." Women reported dresses torn and hair rumpled. Police confiscated more than a hundred slapsticks and arrested six vendors.  Chief Joseph A. Gerk said: "I am opposed to the use of slapsticks and heartily approve of the beating of one man who used a slapstick on a woman." He thought some of the enthusiasm stemmed from the excitement of the World Series being played that week in St. Louis — the Cardinals against the Yankees.1930s: Some onlookers used pea-shooters, rocks and other missiles against the floats. Confectioners' shops stocked the pea-shooters in anticipation of the parade, according to Robert Tooley, who identified himself as VP "den superintendent" in that era. Pea-shooters were again active in 1947, and in that same year "the new plastic bubbles" were evident."550,000 See Veiled Prophet Parade," St. Louis Globe-Democrat, October 8, 1947, page 11937:"For the first time in years," the Globe-Democrat reported, "great volumes of paper were dropped from windows." Some of it was ignited when it came in contact with sparks from trolley wires. Downtown merchants played safe either by "boarding up windows or lining the window sills with boards in which nails were upended" to prevent crowds from pushing against plate-glass windows. "Youths with bean shooters were active, as always."1966: A judge sentenced an 18-year-old man to sixty days in the city workhouse after convicting him of throwing stones at a police car during the weekend VP Parade.

 Ethnic floats 
 19th Century 

In 1882, the parade theme took a new direction, which led to controversy over the inclusion of a float criticized for its portrayal of Irish people. The theme illustrated "the leading characteristics of the principal nations of Asia, Europe and Africa, and giving a special tableau of American scenes, representing the ballot box, the Indian on the plains, life on southern plantations and the western rivers. . . . The tableau came more directly within the comprehension of the average citizen than the mythological representations of previous years and was cheered to the echo."

But St. Louis members of the Irish Land League were incensed over one of the floats, and "it was universally agreed there that there would be a grand and frightful riot unless the Irish float was taken out of the procession." The Irishmen who drove the parade's teams and wagons said they would "withdraw their services" if the float was included, so the entry was removed.

Figures aboard the planned float included shillelagh-wielding men and a woman in "peasant costume" dancing to a fiddle. A "drinking booth with the Irish harp" is nearby. "A pig sty, with a couple of grunters anxiously peering over the side, stands to the left, a bushel basket of potatoes evidently tempting them."

Alonzo Slayback replied that the message of the "first procession" in 1878 had gone "over the heads of the spectators" and since then "we found that a float which aimed rather to convey a pleasant bit of fun pleased the people much better[,] and we have carried out this idea ever since. . . . Let them raise a finger against any part of the pageant, if they dare. I feel sure that there will be on hand a sufficiently large number of people . . . to prevent any attack.  Yes, sir, just let them try it." The day this quotation appeared in the morning Post-Dispatch, Slayback stopped in the office of managing editor John A. Cockerill to request that the latter "suppress all mention of the action of certain citizens regarding the Irish float. . . . Our meeting was pleasant and he went away in good feeling," Cockerill said.

The offending scene was eliminated, and other props were used on the refurbished float.

 20th Century 

In 1938, an Irish-descended group headed by Circuit Judge O'Neil Ryan protested the imagery on a float with the title of a popular song, "Has Anybody Here Seen Kelly?" The name of the float was soon changed to "The Sidewalks of New York." In addition, a statement from the Veiled Prophet organization said: "At the same time the Order announces that the float entitled 'Schnitzelbank' has been changed to 'Harvest Moon,'" which the Star-Times said was done "to forestall possible criticism arising out of the recent European developments."

 Biblical theme 

St. Louis Protestant minister S.J. Nichols castigated the Old Testament theme of the 1887 VP Parade. In a sermon on September 18, he made a "sweeping condemnation," particularly condemning the printed invitation to the ball, which included representations of the Ark of the Covenant and the Ten Commandments. He also denounced floats depicting Moses and Elijah.

Nichols said:

In this shocking prostitution of things sacred, there is a failure to make a distinction between sacred and profane, or common things, and it is calculated to foster the spirit of irreverence and bring God's Word into contempt. . . . All this is done in the name of a great city for gain. . . . [This] last great blunder is well calculated to bring St. Louis into disrepute with other cities . . . .

He was soon answered by David Swing, a widely known progressive minister from Chicago, who wrote:

The "Veiled Prophets" are a set of rather foolish old boys, who are not worthy of any special notice from the pulpit. Their parade once a year can not have much influence for or against the real cause of Christianity. . . . No one is hurt. . . . nearly all the episodes of the Old Testament have been repeatedly pictured in a humorous aspect . . . there are thousands of persons in St. Louis who will gain . . . their first lessons in sacred things . . . . They will learn by pictures of Bible scenes what they can never learn from the baseball grounds alone, nor from a life-long association with cigars and beer.

 Lighting 

 Torchbearers 

The first parade was lit by a thousand torchbearers, all dressed in brown habits, with cowls, "priest fashion," walking beside the floats, carrying gasoline lanterns with three burners each, the affairs looking not unlike sections of the footlights in a small theater in a town where the gas was uncertain as to brilliancy. Others held, with outstretched hands and averted face, long beacon lights, which burned alternately red and blue. The air was filled with the stifling, sulphurous fumes from the burning lights; the eyes of the throng were dazzled, and the air was filled with a unanimous cough.Each man carried "a quadruple gasoline torch with a reflector behind the flame, [flanking it on either side] . . ., respectable but disagreeable flambeaux." The lamp bearers wore protectors to keep their wrists from burning."The Veiled Prophets: At the end of the Procession," St. Louis Daily Globe-Democrat, October 9, 1878, image 2

In the second year, 1879, Daniel Carroll was in charge of the six hundred men hired to lead the horses and carry beacons and torches. He told his men

to be as mysterious as possible and to keep their cowls well drawn over their faces. . . .

Each float in 1879 was drawn by six horses, "covered with snow-white trappings, on which two cabalistic letters, 'V.P.,' were wrought in deep red color." Two mounted horsemen rode before and two behind, and "at each side were four bearers of reflector torches and an equal number of flambeaux carriers." In 1887, these torchbearers were "mostly colored men" dressed in red robes. In 1890, a newspaper said that they were "chiefly negroes of the steamboat type."Black men were often used as stevedores on river boats and at wharfs.

 Other illuminations 

In at least two locations in 1878 locomotive headlights lit up the streets. "The Court-house was the center of the grandest illumination along the entire route," being lit "and covered with Chinese lanterns," the St. Louis Evening Post said.
"'Red fire' was made and placed behind the fountains and caused the water to take the appearance of being sparkling blood." An electric light in front of Tony Faust's building  at Fifth and Elm made the block "as bright as day."

The Daily Commonwealth of Topeka, Kansas, said the 1878 procession, under the

light of various colors thrown upon it, and the glare of illuminated buildings along the route, presented one of the most gorgeous sights imaginable, and elicited almost deafening and continuous applause from the greatest crowd of people ever seen in St. Louis . . . on Bridge Square the most brilliant and beautiful ever seen in the city took place, the air being densely filled with stars of nearly all colors for a height of three hundred feet."

 Natural gas and calcium light 
Some business owners "expended large sums of money" in 1878 to furnish lighting in front of their properties by natural gas, using it "as extravagantly as though it were to be found on the streets for nothing," but they found that their attempts were "so eclipsed" by the "gorgeous dazzle" of the VP Parade "that they became disgusted" and vowed not to do it again the next year. Nevertheless, in 1879, "Fifth street was light as day with its many pyramids of gas jets that had taken the place of the every-day lamp-post illuminations. . . . At each end of the Washington avenue corners of Samuel C. Davis & Co.'s dry goods building, a calcium light shone down upon the multitude."

In 1881, a line of gas pipe was run down Fourth Street, "broken only at the cross streets, from which myriads of jets surrounded by white globes poured forth their effulgence. . . . Swung high in the air at [a] distance of about every thirty feet[,] tall branch lights had been placed, which when fully ablaze resembled . . . a row of beautiful trees hung with brilliant lanterns. The effect was magical." Gusts of wind from the river, however, blew out the lights, which were relit by workers with oakum torches. "Taken as a whole, the effect was very brilliant and will long be remembered by the thousands who witnessed it." After the main gas pipe was opened in the early evening, merchants and businessmen along the route were responsible for lighting the gas jets themselves with torches provided by the gas company.

The 1883 parade was held in conjunction with the 23rd St. Louis (Agricultural) Fair. Twenty-five thousand globes, nineteen arches, and "miles of gas jets" were newly installed, and "many of the business houses will be brilliantly lighted up by gas and electric lights."

In March 1885, Charles H. Lewis and his wife received $283 from the city for the injuries they had received from the falling of a gas pipe at Broadway and Washington Avenue during the VP Parade.

 Electricity 

In 1881, lighting the line of the parade with electric lights suspended from the telegraph poles was discussed but abandoned because, a newspaper report said, "the intense white flames of the electric lamps would interfere with the colored lights." Still, a string of electric lamps were "stretched from the St. Louis Club-house down along Washington avenue to Samuel C. Davis' store on Fifth street." As well, other establishments promised to provide enough electric lights in their vicinities "to turn night into day." And, torch-bearers were "three times as numerous" as they were in previous processions.

In 1894, illuminations were considerably reduced, the rural visitor perhaps being unhappy with the lack of "even the usual number of gas jets and incandescent globes," the Globe-Democrat said, but the floats "and their attendant illuminators had no glare and glitter from street lamps to dim their luster," and the "innovation proved to be a decided success."

The 1903 parade was the first in which the floats, with more than forty thousand mounted electric lights, moved along the streetcar tracks with everything powered by the overhead electric trolley wires. "The pageant will be more clearly seen," The Republic predicted in an advance story. "There will be no dull patches in it. . . . The floats will move much more easily on the streetcar tracks" than they had done before on the asphalt or granite streets. Each float was to be supplied with "300 to 400 incandescent bulbs . . . to produce every effect of lighting that can devised, . . . vivid and full of color." Horses, however, still pulled the floats, "it having been deemed inartistic and impractical to supplant the gallant steeds with buzzing motors," the Post-Dispatch said.

The St. Louis Daily Globe-Democrat noted in 1906 that "The nightly street illumination will remind all who witness its strange and brilliant combination of the wonderful recent advance in lighting the avenues and in rendering the darkness eloquent with various devices. This is one of the triumphs of the new century."

In 1919, a United Railways employee walked behind each wagon, carrying the "trolley rope." The trolley on the Prophet's float was accidentally torn off at 7th and Olive, so it had to be lighted by torches the rest of the way.

 Shift to daylight 

In 1969, the parade was shifted to daylight hours and incorporated into a larger civic celebration. That year was the first in which the Prophet did not appear in the parade."Blacks Attempt to Halt Parade in St. Louis," Decatur (Illinois) Sunday Herald and Review, September 28, 1969, image 4

 Mishaps 1884. A witch character in Float No. 10 "spilled some of the alcohol that was used as fuel in their caldron, and in a moment it was on fire." Attendants stamped out the blaze, and the witches handed the cans of alcohol to them.

 Street conditions, police, and traffic 1879. "Vehicles of all kinds swarmed in and began to block up the crossings so that the police were kept busy . . . making room for the pedestrians. . . . By 8 o'clock the street cars could hardly move . . . ."1881. The VP organization made out a route for the procession and handed it over to Street Commissioner Turner, who, said the Post-Dispatch, would "patch up" the streets "so that the floats may not be stalled and the torch-bearers may not go over a precipice every half block." On parade night, "The vacant lots and all the cross streets . . . were closely packed with wagons, carriages, etc., in which the occupants were standing and sitting."1890. In advance of the parade, the Globe-Democrat said that "A strong cordon of mounted police will act as a skirmish line to clear the crowded streets, while a similar force will follow in the wake to preserve the rear floats . . . . [They will] prevent the hilarity of the occasion from degenerating into stone-throwing . . . ."1893. The "entire police force" was on duty, required to serve "from fifteen to eighteen hours, or about the same time as on election days," an officer assigned to march behind each float, each man "provided with a long cane." Two were on horseback at the rear of the procession, to "keep advertising schemers from following." Police "in citizens' clothes" mingled with the crowds and watched for pickpockets.1894. Vehicles included "the elegant barouche, drawn by a handsome pair [of horses]," "the ash cart dragged along by some poor equine," businessmen's and farmers' wagons, baker wagons, milk carts, drays, carriages, omnibuses, "and one enterprising malt [beer and ale] dealer had transformed his immense vehicle into an observation tower for a jolly crowd of young men and girls." Motormen, conductors and passengers climbed to the top of parked streetcars to watch. . . . It was really a question of which was the happier lot [the Globe-Democrat said] — "the rich laden with diamonds and silks entering the grandest festival of the year or the folks from the country who milked the cows for supper and barely had time to get the straw off their bonnets before they were right there looking on."1906. The parade that year would feature "a great array of decorated vehicles, including automobiles, whose rapid rise and multiplying uses are one of the sensations of the day."1914. Again, the "entire police department" of 1,400 men was on duty "to prevent rowdyism on the streets and arrest any suspicious character." Patrols were assigned to residential areas to guard against burglaries. A city ordinance forbade the use of confetti and slap sticks.1919. The St. Louis Star reported that "never before were so many automobiles massed in the downtown district. It took virtually the entire police force to handle the traffic. Owners of trucks permitted their use by employees, who fitted them with seats for their families and friends." Autos with men and women in evening attire, bound for the ball at the Coliseum, had the right of way.1930. Rules were changed to make egress for automobiles easier after the dance, "so as to occasion the owner the least possible difficulty and delay in getting out of his parking place, and to enable chauffeur-driven cars to reach the door of the Coliseum very quickly after being called. In former years there have been twenty-three [telephone] call stations for cars and of late years only eight or ten . . . have been used because . . . so many guests drive their own cars."1940. In an editorial, the St. Louis Star-Times castigated city officials for not having provided "a modern, scientific pattern" for coping with the 410,000 people who flocked to see the VP Parade, when twelve thousand VP Ball attendees were receiving "first class" traffic arrangements, with special routes set aside and parking places "abundantly provided." The editorial went on: "Failure to provide a modern, scientific pattern for coping with the traffic . . . smacks of indifference and official inertia or a perverse distaste for progress."1941.' Things got better in 1941, with every street intersection manned by one to six officers, and when the larger part of the parade had passed, police cars shuttled the patrolmen to the head of the procession for duty.

 Notable guests 

President Grover Cleveland and his wife, Frances Folsom, attended in 1887"In Society," St. Louis Post-Dispatch, October 7, 1887, image 2 and Margaret Truman, the author and daughter of President Harry S. Truman, in 1969. At the former, the number of invitations to "perhaps the most exclusive ball of them all" had been "somewhat limited" and the guest list "carefully scrutinized," the St. Louis Republic recalled in 1900.

In 1893, sixty representatives from 34 countries or colonies exhibiting at the World's Fair in Chicago arrived by train and were escorted in carriages to the Southern Hotel. They were feted at a dinner, witnessed the parade, and taken to the Ball. The next day featured a tour of St. Louis sights.

The governors of fifteen U.S. states participated in the annual VP festivities in 1907. It was the largest number of state executives ever assembled up to that time in one city. They met with President Theodore Roosevelt and accompanied him on a voyage down the Mississippi River.

Poet Edgar Guest and wife Ellen attended the 1921 ball. Guest authored a poem titled "The Veiled Prophet."

 Publications and programs 

A printed description for the first parade in 1878 was done by Alonzo Slayback, who wrote in his diary that it was "the nearest thing to a stroke of genius that I ever produced." His story, he said, was a "prose poem" which had "brought order and identity out of some very gorgeous but very meaningless representations," the floats in the parade. "For next year, and the year after, and so on for a hundred years . . . the strangers who visit our October fairs can be entertained . . . ."

In 1881, the organization's "official publication" was printed by the Compton Lithographic Works, St. Louis. In the "principal illustration," representing the "hall of the Veiled Prophets, . . . Three or four fire-glowing planets wandering in and out among gleaming pillars send a shower of gold down upon the radiant raiment of the assembled Prophets and light up the picture in a manner that makes a circus poster look like a postage stamp."

A lady's program for each ball listed individual dances for the evening, with spaces for the names of men with whom she would dance. In 1890, for example, it was designed in the form of a shield, with a heavy black cord and hook to attach to a coat or a dress, with a miniature pencil.

 Gallery of illustrations 

 See also 
 Ku Klux Klan in Southern Illinois, for first use of Missouri Republican woodcut of man posing in Ku Klux Klan garb
 List of Veiled Prophet Parade themes
 Fleur de Lis Ball – St. Louis's other debutante cotillion
 Jewel Ball – another debutante cotillion in Missouri
 Walter B. Stevens (1848–1939), active in the VP organization

 Notes and references 

 Further reading 

 Darst, Katherine. "The Prophet's Pearls", The St. Louis Magazine, Vol. 1, No. 4, Sept. 1963.
 Jennings, John J. The Veiled Prophets Unveiled, 1881–1882. "This book had a large sale last year and was accepted by the public as a pleasant revelation of the mysteries of the initiation ceremony each Prophet is obliged to go through. The work is written in a humorous vein and will be found interesting reading by all who are fond of funny literature."
 Nance, Susan. "The Veiled Prophet's Oriental Tale: St. Louis' Famous Festivals in Context, 1878–1895." Missouri Historical Review 103, no. 2 (January 2009): 90–107.
 Stevens, Walter B. St. Louis The Fourth City, 1764–1909,'' S.J. Clarke Publishing Co., 1909.

External links 

 Official site, Veiled Prophet organization
Veiled Prophet Collection finding aid at the St. Louis Public Library
 "Veiled Prophet History", Missouri Historical Society, September 12, 1959 (video)
 The O'Fallon High School marching band at the 1997 VP Parade
 Memories of the Veiled Prophet; How the Floats Are Made in The Den, June 2008, from Nine PBS
 Veiled Prophet activities in 2009, video report by Anne-Marie Berger, from Nine PBS
 Veiled Prophet Parade, July 2, 2011, by Dickson Beall
 "Long and Complicated History of the Veiled Prophet Parade, Organization”, KMOV St. Louis, July 6, 2021  (video feature report)
 Article and map concerning extension of and changes in the VP Parade route between 1890 and 1940
 Beth O'Malley, "Veiled Prophet: Symbol of Wealth, Power, and, to Some, Racism," St. Louis Post-Dispatch, series of historic illustrations, 1878–2016

Culture of St. Louis
Debutante balls
Balls in the United States
Recurring events established in 1878
1878 establishments in Missouri